Muhallebi is a milk pudding commonly made with rice, sugar, milk and either rice flour, starch or semolina, popular as a dessert in the Middle East. While the dessert is called Muhallebi in Greece, Turkey and Iraq, the Egyptian variant is called mahalabia, the levantine variant is called mahalabiyeh.

History
Legend has it that muhallebi was introduced into Arab cuisine in the late seventh century by a Persian cook from what was then Sassanid Persia (224–651), who served it to an Arab general by the name of Al-Muhallab ibn Abi Sufra. He liked it so much, he named it after himself. The earliest recipes, dating to the 10th century, featured three versions: milk thickened with ground rice, milk with rice grains and chicken, and an egg custard without rice. The earliest recipe for muhallabiyya is attributed to Ibn Sayyar al-Warraq of Baghdad. Two 13th-century Arab cookbooks, one by al-Baghdadi and another from Andalusia, have a spiced pudding variation made with mutton instead of chicken. The account of the pudding's Persian origins comes from the Andalusian cookbook.

In the Middle Ages, muhallebi and its European counterpart blancmange were made with shredded chicken. There are records from the Ottoman Empire for two versions of muhallebi: a version with shredded chicken (tavuk göğsü) served during the reign of Mehmed the Conqueror, and a later recipe dating to 1530 for a meatless version flavored with rose water.

One 19th-century, English cookbook that gives a recipe for muhallebi calls it "Ramazan cakes". The recipe calls for boiling milk together with rice flour and sugar until the mixture reduces. The pudding is flavored with rose or jasmine extract, and allowed to cool before it is sprinkled with powdered sugar.

Variations

In the modern era the traditional tavuk göğsü is no longer widely available, except in Turkey. This pudding does not taste like chicken but the shredded meat gives it a distinctive texture. George Coleman De Kay said the pudding "owes its peculiar excellent flavour to the presence of the breasts of very young chickens, which are by some means so intimately blended and incorporated with the custard as to be scarcely distinguishable". Kazandibi is the variation of classic tavuk göğsü where a thin layer of pudding is caramelized before the custard is poured over it and allowed to set. The finished pudding is served upside down with the caramelized side on top. Also available at the muhallebici shops of Istanbul are the almond based keşkül, Noah's Pudding, and baked rice pudding called fırın sütlaç or fırında sütlaç.

Other flavours of the jelly layer can be used, like rose syrup.
Mahalayeh sold in Restaurants in Syria is always served with three striped toppings of slithered almonds, cream, sliced pistachios, and a Maraschino Cherry. The famous Booza shop, Bakdash, in Damascus serves Mahalayeh as well as Booza.

Israeli malabi is topped with chopped pistachios, desiccated coconut and a syrup usually made with rosewater or orange flower water and dyed bright red using food coloring. Another Israeli variation of Malabi uses almond milk instead of the regular milk, especially when it involves a dish that includes meat dishes, this variation is being done in order to be able to serve the dish as a dessert and at the same time, to avoid violation Jewish dietary law (Kashrut).

In Cyprus, muhallebi is called  ( in Cypriot Greek) and it can also be found in a non-dairy version alongside the version that contains milk. The Cypriot non-dairy muhallebi is made from water, sugar, cornstarch, and rose water, which is optional. When the muhallebi is set, Cypriots add rose squash/cordial/syrup called triantafyllo on top of it.

Mastic can be used as a flavoring for muhallebi.

Culinary traditions

In some Sephardic Jewish homes, malabi made of milk, cream, starch and sugar and flavoured with either distilled rosewater or orange flower water, is served to break the fast on the Jewish holiday of Yom Kippur. It is also eaten at Turkish Jewish weddings to symbolize the sweet life that lies ahead. Sephardim serve it on the festival of Shavuot when it is customary to eat dairy food, but according to food historian Gil Marks, the real reason is that the holiday is known in this community as the "feast of roses" and the dessert has a distinct rosy aroma.

Use in desserts

Muhallebi is used as a component of many traditional style desserts.

Selanik tatlısı, attributed to the kitchens of historic Salonica, is made by thickening a basic stovetop muhallebi with eggs and baking it with a sweetened shortcrust pastry. The dessert is soaked in simple syrup before serving. Also hailing from historic Salonica is muhallebi baklava (similar to the Greek galaktoboureko).

See also
Keşkül
Om Ali

References

Iranian desserts
Levantine cuisine
Turkish puddings
Cypriot cuisine
Lebanese cuisine
Algerian cuisine
Kurdish cuisine
Saudi Arabian cuisine
Lebanese desserts
Israeli desserts
North African cuisine
Ottoman cuisine
Milk dishes
Sephardi Jewish cuisine
Arab desserts